Geobatrachus walkeri, commonly known as Walker's Sierra frog, is a species of frog in the family Craugastoridae. It is the only species in the monotypic genus Geobatrachus. It is endemic to Sierra Nevada de Santa Marta, Colombia. Its natural habitat is subtropical or tropical moist montane forests. It is threatened by habitat loss.

References

Craugastoridae
Amphibians of Colombia
Amphibians of the Andes
Amphibians described in 1915
Endemic fauna of Colombia
Monotypic amphibian genera
Taxa named by Alexander Grant Ruthven
Taxonomy articles created by Polbot